The USAT Meigs (sometimes incorrectly called USS Meigs) was a United States Army transport ship that was built in 1921 and sunk in Darwin Harbour in the first Japanese air raid against the Australia mainland on 19 February 1942.

Building
The ship's keel was laid 30 July 1920 by the Los Angeles Shipbuilding and Dry Dock Company (later Todd Pacific Shipyards) at San Pedro, California and completed in 1921 for the United States Shipping Board as West Lewark. She had a steel hull, measured  (also cited as 11,358 DWT),  beam and  depth. The ship's construction was canceled in 1919 but she was then completed to a larger and different design (Design EFC 1133) than the originally planned Design 1013 and launched 24 February 1921. She was evaluated for naval use with designation ID-4490.

Peacetime service
After delivery the ship was operated by the Williams, Diamond & Company, Pacific Coast shippers for the Pacific Coast-European trade. Cargo handling equipment had been designed in light of the fact that many ports lacked sufficient handling equipment ashore to enable efficient cargo operations and initial service demonstrated increased efficiency. 
West Lewark and sister ship, West Faralon were placed in the company's Pacific Coast-European trade with West Lewark making an initial port call at Glasgow, Scotland. In 1922 the Army acquired the ship and renamed her Meigs.

USAT Meigs was one of the small fleet the Army maintained during the inter-war years and operated in the Pacific as a freight and animal transport. In 1939, with USAT Ludington, Meigs was one of only two Army owned freight transports. Included in the requirement to transport army goods and personal possessions of personnel changing duty stations to the Pacific was transport of cavalry and personal horses of officers with occasional mention of the ship transporting notable horses or owners transferring between Pacific and continental postings. In July 1938 Meigs found an oil slick along the course of the lost Pan American flying boat Hawaii Clipper about 500 miles from Manila, took samples and stood by for further investigation.

War service
Shortly before the US entry into World War II, the ship was given the tentative Navy hull number AK-34 under an agreement that Navy would take over then commission and crew any Army transports operating in areas of potential naval opposition. The reality of war resulted in a December 1941 Presidential order suspending that agreement and the hull number is listed by Navy as "not used."

USAT Meigs was part of the Pensacola Convoy attempting to reinforce the Philippines in the early stages of the Pacific War and held at Fiji when it was evident the Japanese were already invading the Philippines. Despite a military decision to bring the convoy back to Hawaii or the West Coast, a presidential decision routed the ships to Australia to attempt Philippine support from there.

On 19 February 1942 Japanese aircraft attacked Darwin's land and shipping targets in two waves. The Meigs was one of six ships sunk, with one of its crew of 66 killed, after being struck by a number of bombs and aerial torpedoes.

Wreck
Although the superstructure of the wreck was salvaged after the war by Fujita Salvage of Osaka, Japan, the cargo of munitions, railway rails, Bren gun carriers and trucks intended for Allied forces in Portuguese Timor remains. The Meigs is now a dive site, where the remnants of the cargo are as visible as the remains of the vessel itself.

Namesakes

There was also a small Quartermaster Corps passenger and freight steamer built in 1892 by John H. Dialogue & Son, Camden New Jersey, and serving in the early 20th century named General Meigs.

See also
 List of ships sunk by the Imperial Japanese Navy

References

External links
 The Bombing of Darwin
 Australian War Memorial, photograph P05303.019
 The war at home: Second World War shipwrecks in Australian waters
 

1921 ships
Design 1133 ships of the United States Army
Ships built in Los Angeles
Ships sunk in the bombing of Darwin, 1942
Maritime incidents in February 1942
Transport ships of the United States Army
World War II auxiliary ships of the United States
Wreck diving sites